Siričino is a village in the municipality of Jegunovce, North Macedonia.

Demographics
As of the 2021 census, Siričino had 399 residents with the following ethnic composition:
Macedonians 363
Persons for whom data are taken from administrative sources 30
Others 6

In the 2002 census the village had a total of 395 inhabitants, all of whom were ethnic Macedonians.

References

Villages in Jegunovce Municipality